The Associated Press Stylebook (generally called the AP Stylebook), alternatively titled The Associated Press Stylebook and Briefing on Media Law, is a style and usage guide for American English grammar created by American journalists working for or connected with the Associated Press journalism cooperative based in New York City. Although it is sold as a guide for reporters, it has become the leading reference for most forms of public-facing corporate communication over the last half-century. The Stylebook offers a basic reference to American English grammar, punctuation, and principles of reporting, including many definitions and rules for usage as well as styles for capitalization, abbreviation, spelling, and numerals.

The first publicly available edition of the book was published in 1953. The first modern edition was published in August 1977 by Lorenz Press. Afterwards, various paperback editions were published by different publishers including, among others, Turtleback Books, Penguin's Laurel Press, Pearson's Addison-Wesley, and Hachette's Perseus Books and Basic Books. Recent editions are released in several formats, including paperback and flat-lying spiral-bound editions, as well as a digital e-book edition and an online subscription version. Additionally, the AP Stylebook also provides English grammar recommendations through social media, including Twitter, Facebook, Pinterest, and Instagram.

From 1977 to 2005, more than two million copies of the AP Stylebook have been sold worldwide, with that number climbing to  million by 2011. Writers in broadcasting, news, magazine publishing, marketing departments and public relations firms traditionally adopt and apply AP grammar and punctuation styles.

Organization
The AP Stylebook is organized into sections:

Business Guidelines
A reference section for reporters covering business and financial news including general knowledge of accounting, bankruptcy, mergers, and international bureaus. For instance, it includes explanations of five different chapters of bankruptcy.

Sports Guidelines and Style
Includes terminology, statistics, organization rules and guidelines commonly referenced by sports reporters, such as the correct way to spell and use basketball terminology like half-court pass, field goal and goal-tending.

Guide to Punctuation 
A specific guide on how to use punctuation in journalistic materials. This section includes rules regarding hyphens, commas, parentheses, and quotations.

Briefing on Media Law
An overview of legal issues and ethical expectations for those working in journalism, including the difference between slander and libel. Slander is spoken; libel is written.

Photo Captions
The simple formula of what to include when writing a photo caption, usually called a cutline in newspapers.

Editing Marks
A key with editing symbols to assist the journalist with the proofreading process.

Digital Security
A guide to protect journalists, their work, sources, online accounts, and avoid online harassment.

Bibliography
This provides second reference materials for information not included in the book. For example, it says to use Webster's New World College Dictionary as a reference after the AP Stylebook for spelling, style, usage and foreign geographic names.

Title
From 1909, when the first company-wide stylebook-like guide was released internally under the title: "The Associate Press Rules Regulations and General Orders", and until 1953, the stylebook was published under different titles including, among others, Instructions for Correspondents of the Associated Press, The Associated Press. Regulations Traffic Department, A Guide for Filing Editors. The Associated Press, A Guide for Foreign Correspondents. The Associated Press, A Guide for Writers. The Associated Press, The AP Copy Book, and AP Writing Handbook.

By the end of WWII, pressures from a growing number of non-journalistic business sectors, already referencing copied or confiscated copies of the guide for years, greatly increased the stylebook's demand. The first publicly available edition of AP Stylebook was published in 1953 under the title "The Associated Press Style Book". Since 1953, the stylebook has been published under different titles, including  Writing for The AP; AP Stylebook; and The Associated Press Stylebook and Libel Manual.

Some journalists have referred to The AP Stylebook as the 'journalist bible'.

In 2000, the guide was renamed The Associated Press Stylebook and Briefing on Media Law and the paperback edition has been published under this title since then. Some editions, such as the spiral-bound and e-book editions, use the shorter title The Associated Press Stylebook on their covers.

History
The Associated Press organization was first created in 1846. The first company-wide AP "guide" did not cover English grammar. It was more of a brochure with 24 pages of various titles and corporate structures of the Associated Press organization and was first published in 1900 under the title "The Associated Press".

Although a formal English grammar style guide did not exist across the organization through the 1800s, individual bureaus were known to have maintained similar internal style guides as early as the late 1870s. The first corporate-wide style guide, with a complete reference to American English words and grammar, was released in 1909, under the title: "The Associate Press Rules Regulations and General Orders".

By the early 1950s the publication was formalized into the AP Stylebook and became the leading professional English grammar reference by most member and non-member news bureaus throughout the world. Due to growing demand by non-member journalists and writers working in public-facing corporate communications, the AP published their first official "stylebook" for the general public in 1953 under the title Associated Press Style Book; the first publication focused on "where the wire set a specific style". For nearly a quarter century it assumed its reader had a "solid grounding in language and a good reference library" and thus omitted any guidelines in those broader areas. In 1977, prompted by AP Executive News Editor Lou Boccardi's request for "more of a reference work", the organization started expanding the book and in 1977 produced a book that was different in a few fundamental regards. Firstly, The structure was changed and entries were organized in alphabetical order so that users could find what they need in a timely manner. Secondly, in 1977 the book was published for the first time by a 3rd party publisher – Lorenz Press. Thirdly, in 1977, United Press International and AP cooperated to produce stylebooks for each organization based on revisions and guidelines jointly agreed to by editors of both UPI Stylebook (Bobby Ray Miller) and AP Stylebook (Howard Angione). In 1982, Eileen Alt Powell, a co-editor of AP Stylebook 1980 edition, stated that: 

In 1989, Norm Goldstein became the AP Stylebook lead editor, a job he held until the 2007 edition. After publishing the final edition under his editorship, Goldstein commented on the future of the AP Stylebooks section on name references: 

After Norm Goldstein stepped down as lead editor in 2007, in bibliographical records for all subsequent editions starting from 2008 lead editors' names are usually not explicitly called out and the author is simply referred to as Associated Press or AP Editors. In 2009 and 2011 the Stylebook was released as an app called AP Stylebook Mobile edition for iOS and BlackBerry, respectively, however it was later discontinued in 2015 in favor of users simply accessing the AP Stylebook online edition through their desktop or mobile browsers. In March 2019 AP created an Archived AP Stylebooks section on its apstylebook.com website where anyone can access previous versions of the AP Stylebook starting from 1900 "brochure on AP corporate structure" and all the way to 1977 edition.

The first Spanish AP stylebook was created in 2012, after requests from the AP Mexico City bureau and others to develop such a stylebook. The bureau at the time was looking for ways to expand into Latin America while bridging the language barrier. In 2013 the AP Spanish Stylebook came into fruition and is now available to everyone. The Spanish AP stylebook is also referred to as the Manual de Estilo.

The most recent print edition is the 2020–2022 AP Stylebook, available spiral-bound directly from AP, and as a perfect-bound paperback sold by Basic Books. Creation of AP Stylebook has been helmed by lead editor Paula Froke since 2016. In early 2023, the stylebook attracted attention for suggesting that "the French" could be an offensive term in a tweet promoting people-first language; there was considerable mockery of the suggestion, and the AP subsequently retracted it.

Influence on American English

The influence of the AP and similar news service styles has reached beyond the news writing community. Many other North American sectors disseminating information to the public began to adopt news styles as early as the late 1800s. Many other sectors now also have developed their own similar style guides and also continue to reference the AP Stylebook for general American grammar, more than any other style guide available.

Edition

Edition number: English edition 
The first publicly available English edition of the book was released in 1953. However, all editions prior to 1977 are not included in the editions count and the first modern edition is considered to be the August 1977 edition released for the first time by Lorenz Press. The latest, 2020 version, is the 55th edition and can be used until 2022. The Associated Press has reduced the frequency in print publication due to the popularity of the online version of the AP Stylebook. The print version is expected to be available, unless otherwise stated, biennially.

Edition number: Spanish edition 
Due to the rising influence of the Spanish language worldwide, in November 2012 Associated Press added, in addition to American English, its first ever Spanish edition of its stylebook. The Spanish edition is separate from English edition and has a different website, as well as Twitter and Facebook accounts. Unlike the English edition which currently has both online and print versions, the Spanish edition only has an online edition. The Spanish edition does not have an 'edition number' since it only exists as an online service.

Revision process
From 1980 to 1984 the English edition was updated biennially; then from 1985 to 2020, the English edition was updated annually, usually in May, at which time edits and new entries were added to keep the stylebook up to date with technological and cultural changes. As of the end of 2022, no further editions have been published since the 2020 edition.

In 2005, dozens of new or revised entries were added, including "Sept. 11", "e.g.", "i.e.", "FedEx" and "Midwest region".

In 2008, about 200 new or revised entries were added, including "iPhone", "anti-virus", "outsourcing", "podcast", "text messaging", "social networking", "high-definition" and "Wikipedia".

In 2009, about 60 new or revised entries were added, including "Twitter", "baba ghanoush" and "texting".

In 2013, about 90 new or revised entries were added, including "Benedictine", "Grand Marnier", "madeleine" and "upside-down cake", "chichi" and "froufrou".

In 2019, about 200 new or revised entries were added, including "budtender", "deepfake" and "cryptocurrency".

The 2020–2022 edition was released on May 21, 2020. About 90 new or revised technology-related entries were added, including "internet privacy", "digital wallet" / "mobile wallet", "smart devices", and "lidar".  A new chapter was added about digital security for journalists.

Notes

References

External links
 (English edition)
 (Spanish edition)
Quick Associated Press Style from The COM Writing Center, at scribd.com 

Stylebook
Style guides for American English
Publications established in 1909
Journalism standards